The mouse-gray flycatcher or mouse-grey flycatcher (Myiophobus crypterythrus) is a species of bird in the family Tyrannidae. It is found in southwest Colombia, western Ecuador, and northwestern Peru. Its natural habitat is subtropical or tropical moist montane forests.

References

Myiophobus
Birds of Ecuador
Birds of Peru
Birds described in 1861
Taxa named by Philip Sclater